Galkino is a rural locality (a village) in Posyolok Nikologory, Vyaznikovsky District, Vladimir Oblast, Russia. The population was 326 as of 2010. There are 8 streets.

Geography 
Galkino is located on the Tetrukh River, 31 km southwest of Vyazniki (the district's administrative centre) by road. Edon is the nearest rural locality.

References 

Rural localities in Vyaznikovsky District
Sudogodsky Uyezd